Edward Vernon (6 March 1851 – 27 June 1902) was a New Zealand cricketer. He played two first-class matches for Otago between 1878 and 1880.

See also
 List of Otago representative cricketers

References

External links
 

1851 births
1902 deaths
New Zealand cricketers
Otago cricketers
Cricketers from Dublin (city)